Salah Rashed   is a football player from the United Arab Emirates.

Position:Midfielder.

Number: 7.

Favorite Leg: Left Leg.

Known as: Freekick Shooter. (Scored wonderful, amazing and incredible goals from free kicks.

Played for:

Al-Ahli Club, Dubai, UAE.

United Arab Emiratesin the 1984 Asian Cup.

References
Stats

Emirati footballers
United Arab Emirates international footballers
1984 AFC Asian Cup players
Living people
Al Ahli Club (Dubai) players
UAE Pro League players
Association football midfielders
Year of birth missing (living people)